The Asia/Oceania Zone is one of three zones of regional competition in the 2022 Billie Jean King Cup.

Group I 
 Venue: Megasaray Tennis Academy, Antalya, Turkey (clay)
 Date: 12–16 April 2022

The six teams were placed into one pool of six teams. The nations finishing 1st and 2nd advanced to the 2022 Billie Jean King Cup play-offs. The nations finishing fifth and last were relegated to Group II for 2023.

Seeding

 1Billie Jean King Cup Rankings as of 8 November 2021

Pools 

Group II 
 Venue 1: National Tennis Center, Kuala Lumpur, Malaysia (hard) 
 Venue 2: Central Stadium Frunze, Dushanbe, Tajikistan (hard)
 Dates: 8–13 August 2022 (Kuala Lumpur) / 22–27 August 2022 (Dushanbe)

Eighteen nations competed in Group II of the Asia/Oceania Zone in two venues. In Kuala Lumpur, ten nations were split into two groups of 5, with the top finishing nations competing in a promotion play-off to advance to Group I in 2023. In Dushanbe, eight nations were split into two groups of 4, with the top finishing nations competing in a promotion play-off to advance to Group I in 2023.

Seeding

Kuala Lumpur

 1Billie Jean King Cup Rankings as of 19 April 2022

Dushanbe

 1Billie Jean King Cup Rankings as of 19 April 2022

Pools

Play-offs

Final placements 

References 

 Billie Jean King Cup Result, 2022 Asia/Oceania Group I
 Billie Jean King Cup Result, 2022 Asia/Oceania Group II

External links 
 Billie Jean King Cup website

 
Asia/Oceania
Tennis tournaments in Turkey
Billie Jean King Cup Asia/Oceania Zone